Årsunda IF is a Swedish football club located in Årsunda.

Background
Årsunda IF currently plays in Division 4 Gestrikland which is the sixth tier of Swedish football. They play their home matches at the Årsunda IP in Årsunda.

The club is affiliated to Gestriklands Fotbollförbund. Årsunda IF have competed in the Svenska Cupen on 17 occasions and have played 24 matches in the competition.

Season to season

In their most successful period Årsunda IF competed in the following divisions:

In recent seasons Årsunda IF have competed in the following divisions:

Footnotes

External links
 Årsunda IF – Official website

Football clubs in Gävleborg County